Cardiac notch may refer to:
 Cardiac notch of the left lung
 Cardiac notch of stomach